This is a list of official symbols for the U.S. state of Illinois:

State symbols

See also

Flags of the U.S. states and territories
Index of Illinois-related articles
List of U.S. state, district, and territorial insignia
Outline of Illinois

Notes

References

State Symbols
Illinois